The American Community School Beirut, also known as Acs Beirut, is a private school located in Beirut, Lebanon. Founded in 1905, it is traditionally attached to the American University of Beirut. As an independent coeducational institution, it offers education to students of all nationalities, ranging from preschool, students aged from 3 years, to high school grade 12 of the type K-12. It offers the International Baccalaureate and the Lebanese Baccalaureate programs as well as its own college prep program.

History 
The school was founded by a small group of American parents like andy and Nadia tajisadek who are from the American University of Beirut, then known as the Syrian Protestant College, who wanted a school where their children could receive preparation for entrance into American universities. The small faculty school thrived and by 1920 had expanded from its original home on rue Bliss to a red-roofed house on rue Sidani. At this point, the American Presbyterian Mission joined the AUB in sponsorship of the school. It was at this point that the school was renamed to the American Community School. By the 1940s, the student body had grown to more than 900 primarily Western children; the present building was built in 1949 with funds provided by ARAMCO. Today, students are primarily Lebanese, as with the university.

The school celebrated its Centennial on June 24, 2005, and in June 2011, ACS Beirut celebrated the graduation of its 100th graduating class.  Dr. George H. Damon Jr. remained Headmaster of the school from 2003 till his retirement in 2013.

ACS's history is described by Wade Morris Jr. in A History of ACS; The American Community School at Beirut 1905-2012.

Academics 

ACS Beirut offers three types of a high school diploma. The American High School Diploma program prepares students for admission to colleges and universities in the US. All graduates will earn the high school diploma. Additionally, ACS offers the International Baccalaureate diploma as well as the Lebanese Baccalaureate diploma. Each of these three diploma programs has a slightly different course of study, but only in selected grade levels. For the IB Diploma Program, the course of study is differentiated in the last two years of high school. For the Lebanese Baccalaureate, the course of study differs in grades 9 and 12. Otherwise, regardless of their diploma program, students are all exposed to an American curriculum characterized by the study of values that include openness, democracy, and creativity, as well as respect for all religions and gender equity.

Campus Facilities 

The ACS campus is located within a short distance from the Mediterranean sea.
The Lower School building consists of a library, computer center, auditorium, multipurpose hall, art room, as well as the Early Years and Elementary administrative wing. The Middle School building houses all Middle School classrooms, science laboratories, lego robotics lab, High School student services, counselors, infirmary, special support personnel, college counselor, and community service advisor, as well as the Upper Library and the Middle School computer center. The building has its own auditorium and music room and houses the School Cafeteria. The Upper School Building, also known as BD Building, consists of a bookstore, Community Lounge, Print Shop, IT Department, High School classrooms, and laboratories, as well as administrative offices. The gymnasium, built in the late 1950s, stood as an architectural landmark for decades and includes a basketball court, locker rooms, a dance studio, and a fitness center.  The faculty building was completed in April 2015. The first basement and ground floor host music rooms for elementary, middle, and high school divisions. Elementary language rooms and Grade 5 classrooms are located on first through the third floor. The residential part consists of 16 typical apartments starting on the 4th up to the 11th. The Head of School residence is located on the 12th and 13th floor with a rooftop that is used for social gatherings, as well as collecting solar energy to help become environmentally friendly.

Athletics 
ACS Beirut is notable for its athletics program. The athletics program partakes in several sporting conferences, including NESAC along with locally held tournaments. The athletics department at ACS Beirut promotes a "student-athlete" relationship whereby the academic standing of a student is the prerequisite for a student's athletic standing.

There are several awards presented to student-athletes at different levels in Middle School and High School. While all team members are presented with participation patches, four outstanding athletes are presented with four awards respectively. These awards, determined by the coach, are the Fighting Heart Award, the Most Improved Player, Perfect Attendance Award, and Coach's Award. In a more holistic approach, there are three awards, the Spirit in Sports Award, Junior Knight Award, and Knight Award. The Spirit in Sports Award is presented to the athlete that displays outstanding school spirit, sportsmanship, and participation. The Junior Knight Award is presented to one male and one female from grades 9 and 10 who demonstrate outstanding dedication, skill, sportsmanship, and leadership. Likewise, the Knight Award is presented to one male and one female who demonstrate the same values described by the Junior Knight Award, however, it is presented to students from grades 11 and 12. Additionally, select seniors are recognized through two awards, The Blair Harcourt Award and the Farah Family Athletics and Leadership Award. The Blair Harcourt Award is presented to the senior with academic distinction, 3.3/4 GPA or higher, as well as athletic distinction, standing in parallel with the values of the Knight Award. The Farah Family Athletics and Leadership Award is presented to the senior who excels in the academic program at ACS Beirut, demonstrates leadership and commitment, and positively impacts the athletic and academic life at ACS Beirut.

At the head of the Athletics Department of ACS Beirut is the athletics and activities director. The current director is Mo Hourani, preceded by former director Joe Toler (2017-2020).

Notable alumni 
 Stewart Copeland, drummer for The Police, whose father Miles Copeland Jr. was the longtime CIA station chief in Beirut
 Malcolm H. Kerr, historian
 Keanu Reeves, actor
 Scott E. Parazynski, NASA Astronaut (retired)
 John Woods
 Bran Ferren, designer
 Steve Kerr, current head coach of the Golden State Warriors
 Greg Kinnear, actor
 Omar Naim, director

See also
 Education in the Ottoman Empire

References 

 8. Scott E. Parazynski; https://en.wikipedia.org/wiki/Scott_E._Parazynski

External links 
ACS Beirut Official Social Media Channels
 Installation of New ACS Head of School, Thomas M. Cangiano (Sept. 2021)
 ACS Redesigned Website Welcome Note by Hamilton Clark, Head of School (June 2016)

Beirut
International schools in Beirut
Educational institutions established in 1905
1905 establishments in the Ottoman Empire